868 Lova (prov. designation:  or ) is a large and dark background asteroid, approximately  in diameter, from the central regions of the asteroid belt. It was discovered by German astronomer Max Wolf at the Heidelberg-Königstuhl State Observatory on 26 April 1917. The carbonaceous C-type asteroid (Ch) and has a long rotation period of 41.1 hours and is likely elongated in shape. The origin of the asteroid's name remains unknown.

Orbit and classification 

Lova is a non-family asteroid of the main belt's background population when applying the hierarchical clustering method to its proper orbital elements. It orbits the Sun in the central asteroid belt at a distance of 2.3–3.1 AU once every 4 years and 5 months (1,624 days; semi-major axis of 2.7 AU). Its orbit has an eccentricity of 0.15 and an inclination of 6° with respect to the ecliptic. The body's observation arc begins at Heidelberg Observatory on 3 March 1930, almost 13 years after its official discovery observation.

Naming 

This minor planet was named by the discoverer. Any reference of this name to a person or occurrence is unknown.

Unknown meaning 

Among the many thousands of named minor planets, Lova is one of 120 asteroids, for which no official naming citation has been published.

Physical characteristics 

In the Tholen classification, Lova is a common, dark C-type asteroid with a noisy spectrum, while in the Bus–Binzel SMASS classification, it is a hydrated, carbonaceous subtype (Ch).

Rotation period 

In November 2017, a rotational lightcurve of Lova was obtained from photometric observations by Tom Polakis at the Command Module Observatory  in Arizona. Lightcurve analysis gave a well-defined rotation period of  hours with a brightness variation of  magnitude. While not being a slow rotator, which have periods of 100 or more hours, Lovas period is significantly longer than the vast majority of asteroids, which rotate within 2.2 to 20 hours once around their axis.

A lower-rated lightcurve by French amateur astronomer Laurent Bernasconi gave a similar period of  hours with a higher amplitude of  magnitude, indicative of an elongated shape. The results supersede a period determination with a lower limit of  hours and amplitude of at least  magnitude by Brian Warner at his Palmer Divide Observatory in Colorado from November 1999. In 2006, Warner revised his photometric data, though with no notable improvement or change for this asteroid.

Diameter and albedo 

The Collaborative Asteroid Lightcurve Link adopts the results from IRAS, that is, a low albedo of 0.0524 and a diameter of 52.47 kilometers based on an absolute magnitude of 10.22.

Two asteroid occultations, observed on 5 April 2006 and 12 July 2007, gave a best-fit ellipse dimension of (52.0 × 52.0) and (43.3 × 64.3) kilometers, respectively, with the latter being the better rated one. These timed observations are taken when the asteroid passes in front of a distant star.

Notes

References

External links 
 Lightcurve Database Query (LCDB), at www.minorplanet.info
 Dictionary of Minor Planet Names, Google books
 Asteroids and comets rotation curves, CdR – Geneva Observatory, Raoul Behrend
 Discovery Circumstances: Numbered Minor Planets (1)-(5000) – Minor Planet Center
 
 

000868
Discoveries by Max Wolf
Named minor planets
000868
000868
19170426